The Lyme class were a class of two 24-gun sixth-rate frigates of the Royal Navy. They served during the War of the Austrian Succession and the Seven Years' War.

They were built to the draught of a French privateer named Le Tygre, which had been captured earlier in 1747. They were initially rated as 24-gun ships, in spite of having four 3-pdr guns mounted on the quarterdeck, as well as the twenty-four 9-pdr guns forming their primary battery on the upper deck.  However, in 1756 they were re-classed as 28-gun ships.  They are normally seen as the first true sailing frigates to be built for the Royal Navy.

Ships in class 
HMS Lyme
 Ordered: 29 April 1747
 Builder:  Deptford Royal Dockyard
 Laid Down:  24 September 1747
 Launched:  10 December 1748
 Completed:  8 February 1749
 Fate:  Wrecked off the Baltic coast of Sweden on 18 October 1760.
HMS Unicorn
 Ordered: 29 April 1747
 Builder:  Plymouth Royal Dockyard
 Laid down:  3 July 1747
 Launched:  7 December 1748
 Completed:  17 July 1749
 Fate:  Broken up at Sheerness Dockyard in December 1771

References 
 David Lyon, "The Sailing Navy List", Brasseys Publications, London 1993.
 Rif Winfield, "British Warships in the Age of Sail, 1714 to 1792", Seaforth Publishing, London 2007.  

Frigate classes